Niklas Sundin (born 13 August 1974 in Gothenburg, Sweden) is a musician of the band Mitochondrial Sun, but was best known as the founding lead guitarist of band Dark Tranquillity (1989–2020). He was also one of the guitarists in the band Laethora (2005–2010).

In Dark Tranquillity, he was one of only two members (the other being drummer Anders Jivarp) to maintain his musical role, unlike the other members who have or had switched. He also wrote some of the lyrics for the first three and recent two Dark Tranquillity albums (Lead singer Mikael Stanne wrote all of Dark Tranquillity's lyrics from Projector through Fiction) and In Flames' album The Jester Race, and continued to translate In Flames vocalist Anders Fridén's lyrics from Swedish to English for the next few albums while Anders worked to become more proficient in English. Although he quit Dark Tranquillity in 2016, it wasn't announced until 22 March 2020.

Sundin is also the founder of Cabin Fever Media, which among other things creates artwork for metal bands. He recently published a book of independent artwork and sketches. He has done album layouts for bands such as In Flames, Eternal Tears of Sorrow, Meridian Dawn, Arch Enemy, Nightrage, Sentenced, Kryptos, and Fragments of Unbecoming, as well as his own bands.

Equipment
His main guitars are Gibson Faded SG, Gibson 1983 Flying V, and an Ibanez IC400; he also uses a custom J. Nunis SC1, 2 Gibson Les Pauls (Standard and Gothic), and a Fender Talon I. He previously used Rocktron Chameleon rack mounted pre-amplifiers, but after the Damage Done tour, he and Martin Henriksson began using Peavey 5150 and Mesa/Boogie Dual Rectifier amplifiers along with Behringer V-AMP 2 modeling processors. In the making of We Are the Void, they are seen in the studio using a Peavey 6505, an ENGL Powerball, as well as a Bugera amplifier. . He also endorses Mayones Guitars & Basses.

Discography as musician 
(1993) Dark Tranquillity - Skydancer
(1995) Dark Tranquillity - The Gallery
(1997) Dark Tranquillity - The Mind's I
(1999) Dark Tranquillity - Projector
(2000) Dark Tranquillity - Haven
(2002) Dark Tranquillity - Damage Done
(2005) - Dark Tranquillity - Character
(2006) "In a Drowse" - Gallows Gallery -  Sigh (Guitar solo)
(2007) Laethora - March of the Parasite
(2007) Dark Tranquillity - Fiction
(2010) Laethora - The Light In Which We All Burn
(2010) Dark Tranquillity - We Are The Void
(2013) Dark Tranquillity - Construct
(2016) Dark Tranquillity - Atoma
(2020) Mitochondrial Sun - Mitochondrial Sun

Album covers
...And Oceans - A.M.G.O.D.
Ablaze My Sorrow - Anger, Hate, Fury
Adversary - Singularity
Aephanemer - Know Thyself
Aephanemer - Memento Mori
Aephanemer - Prokopton
Aephanemer - A Dream of Wilderness
Ajattara - ITSE
Ajattara - Kuolema
Ajattara - Tyhjyys
Agregator - A Semmi Ágán
Agregator - Szürkület
Alas - Absolute Purity
Amethyst - Dea Noctilucae
Amortis - Gift of Tongues
Andromeda - Extension of the Wish
Andromeda - Crescendo of Thoughts
Andromeda - Chimera
Arch Enemy - Wages of Sin, Burning Angel EP, Anthems of Rebellion, Dead Eyes See No Future EP, Live Doomsday DVD & Rise of the Tyrant
Arise - The Godly Work of Art
Arise - Kings of the Cloned Generation
Armageddon - Embrace the Mystery
As Memory Dies - Transmutate
Autumnblaze - DämmerElbenTragödie
Autumnblaze - Words are Not What They Seem
Avariel - "The Dawn"
Callenish Circle - Flesh Power Dominion
Callenish Circle - My Passion // Your Pain
Callenish Circle - Forbidden Empathy
Ceremonial Oath - The Lost Name of God EP
Charon - Tearstained
Charon - Downhearted
Charon - Little Angel EP
Corporation 187 - Perfection in Pain
Dark Age - s/t 
Dark Tranquillity - Haven
Dark Tranquillity - Projector
Dark Tranquillity - Skydancer/Of Chaos and Eternal Night
Dark Tranquillity - Damage Done
Dark Tranquillity - Exposures – In Retrospect and Denial
Dark Tranquillity - Lost to Apathy
Dark Tranquillity - Character
Dark Tranquillity - Fiction
Dark Tranquillity - We Are the Void
Dark Tranquillity - Construct
Dark Tranquillity - Atoma
Dark Tranquillity - Moment
Dawn of Relic - Lovecraftian Dark
Deadsoil - Sacrifice
Detonation - An Epic Defiance
Detonation - Portals to Uphobia
Dimension Zero - Silent Night Fever
Dimension Zero - This Is Hell
Dominion Caligula - A New Era Rises
Dragonland - Astronomy
Dreamaker - Human Device
Empyrium - Weiland
Enforsaken - The Forever Endeavour
Enter Chaos - Aura Sense
Enter My Silence - Remotecontrolled Scythe
Entwine - Gone
Entwine - New Dawn (mcd)
Eternal Tears of Sorrow - Chaotic Beauty
Eternal Tears of Sorrow - A Virgin and a Whore
Eternal Tears of Sorrow - The Last One for Life (EP)
Ethereal Spawn - Ablaze in Viral Flames
Eventide - Caress the Abstract (mcd)
Eventide - Promo 2000
Eventide - No Place Darker
Eventide - Diaries from the Gallows
Evilheart - Storm Of Annihilation
Eyetrap - Folk Magic
Fall - "The Insatiable Weakness"
Fields of Asphodel - Deathflower (mcd)
Flowing Tears - Jade
Fragments of Unbecoming - Sterling Black Icon
Gaia - Gaia
Gardenian - Sindustries
Gardenian - Soulburner
Green Carnation - Journey to the End of the Night
Green Carnation - Light of Day, Day of Darkness
Green Carnation - The Quiet Offspring
Harm - Devil
Hypocrite - Edge of Existence
In Flames - The Tokyo Showdown
In Flames - Reroute to Remain
In Flames - Trigger
In Flames - Soundtrack to Your Escape
In Flames - "The Quiet Place"
Jeremy - Edge on the History
Jeremy - The 2nd Advent
Kang in O - s/t
Kayser - Frame the World...Hang on the Wall
Kerozene - Kerozene
Kiuas - The New Dark Age
Kryptos - Spiral Ascent
Lacrimas Produndere - Ave End
Last Tribe - The Uncrowned
Laethora - March of the Parasite
Lahmia - Into The Abyss
Lost Horizon - Awakening the World
Love in the Time of Cholera - The Sun Through Glass
Luciferion - The Apostate
Lullacry - Be My God
Madrigal - Enticed (ep)
Madrigal - I Die You Soar
Mercenary - 11 Dreams
Mercenary - Architect of Lies
Miscellany - Catch-22
Mirrored Mind - At Meridian
Moonshine - Eternal
Moonsorrow - Suden Uni
Mourning Caress - Escape
My Blood Is Fire - The End of Innocence
Mörk Gryning - Maelstrom Chaos
Naglfar - Sheol
Narcissus - Crave and Collapse
Nightrage - Sweet Vengeance
Novembre - Classica
Opposite Sides - Soul Mechanics
Passenger - Passenger
Passenger - In Reverse (ep)
Pathos - Katharsis
Red Aim - Niagara
Rockateers - Louder Than Ever (ep)
Sanctus - Aeon Sky
Samadhi - Incandescence
Satanic Slaughter - Banished to the Underworld
Scaar - The Second Incision
Scylla - Mater Dolorosa
Sentenced - Crimson
Sentenced - Killing Me, Killing You (ep)
Shadownation - Promo 2001
Silence - Enola
Silence - The P/O/U/R Letters
Skyfall - Skyfall
Sleeping X - Sleeping X (demo ep)
Soultorn - Masks
Spiritual Beggars - Demons
Sunset Sphere - Storm Before Silence
Supreme Majesty - Tales of a Tragic Kingdom
Supreme Majesty - Danger
Tactile Gemma - Tactile Gemma
The Crest - Letters from Fire
The Forsaken - Traces of the Past
The Moor - Jupiter's Immigrants
The More I See - The More I See
Thundra - Blood of Your Soul
Thyrane - Hypnotic
Thyrfing - Vansinnesvisor
Time Requiem - The Inner Circle of Reality
Turisas - Battle Metal
Underthreat - Deathmosphere
Urban Tales - Signs of Times
Various Artists - No Fashion Classics
Veneficum - Enigma Prognosis
Vermin - Filthy Fucking Vermin
Witchery - Symphony for the Devil (US version)
Within Y - Extended Mental Dimensions
Wolf - Wolf (German edition)
Wolf - Moonshine (ep)

References

External links

Dark Tranquillity
Laethora
Cabin Fever Media

Swedish heavy metal guitarists
1974 births
Living people
Lead guitarists
People from Gothenburg
Dark Tranquillity members
HammerFall members